Eberhard Büchner (born 6 November 1939 in Dresden) is a German operatic and concert tenor. He made his debut in 1964 as Tamino in Mozart's Die Zauberflöte at the Mecklenburg State Theatre.

Recordings 
 Franz Schubert: Messe G-Dur for soprano, tenor, bass, choir, strings and organ: D 167
 Johann Sebastian Bach: St Matthew Passion Peter Schreier – Dresdner Kapellknaben, Rundfunkchor Leipzig, Staatskapelle Dresden Ausschnitte ! – Aufgenommen 1984 in der Lukaskirche zu Dresden Eterna Edition, 1984.
 Eberhard Büchner singt Arien aus deutschen Opern. O. Nicolai, A. Lortzing, Fr. von Flotow, R. Strauss (countess: Magdalena Hajossyova, soprano) R. Wagner. Staatskapelle Berlin, conductor Otmar Suitner
 Beethoven, Ludwig van: Sinfonie Nr. 4 B-dur op. 60 u. Sinfonie Nr. 9 d-moll op. 125. Dresdner Philharmonie. conductor: Herbert Kegel. Rundfunkchor Leipzig u. Rundfunkchor Berlin. Soloists: Alison Hargan, Ute Walther, Eberhard Büchner and Kolos Kovats. Recording: 1983 Dresden
 Georg Friedrich Handel: Ode for St. Cecilia´s Day Monika Frimmer – Soprano, Eberhard Büchner – Tenor, Ein Kammerchor, Händel-Festspielorchester Halle, conductor: Christian Kluttig, ETERNA 1982
 Zwei Herzen im Dreivierteltakt. - Robert Stolz-Melodien Berlin: VEB Dt. Schallplatten, 1981, 33er-Schallplatte im Original-Cover (AMIGA) (stereo 845 182) ISBN stereo 845 182
 J. S. Bach: Kantaten Der Himmel lacht! Die Erde jubilieret, BWV 31 / Erfreut euch, ihr Herzen, BWV 66 (Thomanerchor, Gewandhausorchester, conductor: Hans-Joachim Rotzsch)

References

Sources

External links 
 
 Eberhard Büchner (Tenor) on Bach Cantatas Website
 

1939 births
Living people
Musicians from Dresden
German operatic tenors
Hochschule für Musik Carl Maria von Weber alumni
Recipients of the National Prize of East Germany
20th-century German male opera singers